High1 (하이원, haiwon) Resort is a ski resort in Jeongseon, South Korea. Owned by the public corporation of Kangwon Land, it was developed to revitalize the declining mining towns of Gohan and Sabuk. The resort opened in December 2006. It is one of the largest ski resorts in South Korea along with Yongpyong Resort and Muju Resort.

High1 has three tops named High1 Top, Valley Top and Mountain Hub. High1 Top and Mountain Hub are served by a gondola.

Hihou (하이하우, haihau), a white hound is the mascot of the resort.

The resort is served by the Gohan Station and Sabuk Station.

See also 
 Kangwon Land
 List of ski areas and resorts in South Korea

References

External links 
 Official website

Ski areas and resorts in South Korea
Sports venues in Gangwon Province, South Korea
Jeongseon County